Descriptions of the Jyllands-Posten Muhammad cartoons include explanations for Danish cultural references as well as English translations of Danish and Persian captions; these cartoons became the center of widespread controversy upon their publication in September 2005.

 On a blue background, the caricaturized version of journalist and writer Kåre Bluitgen, wearing a turban with the proverbial orange dropping into it, with the inscription "Publicity stunt". In his hand is a child's stick drawing of Muhammad. At få en appelsin i turbanen "to get an orange in one's turban" is a Danish expression (originating in the play Aladdin by Oehlenschläger) meaning "to experience a stroke of luck": here, the added publicity for his book.
 The Islamic star and crescent merged with the face of Muhammad; his right eye is the star, the crescent surrounds his beard and face.
 Muhammad with a bomb in his turban, with a lit fuse and the Islamic creed (shahadah) written on the bomb.
 A gentle styled caricature of Muhammad wearing loose pants with his arms tucked in the sleeves of a type of loose fitting tunic.  His outfit is likely a salwar kameez. A glowing crescent around his turban suggests a halo or possibly a pair of horns.
 A schematic stick drawing of five almost identical figures. Each of them resembles a headscarf seen from the side and has a Star of David and a crescent where the face should be. A poem on oppression of women is attached to the cartoon: "Profet! Med kuk og knald i låget / som holder kvinder under åget!", in English: "Insane prophet! / Keeping women under the yoke!" The poem is in the form of a grook, short, aphoristic poems created by  Danish poet and scientist Piet Hein.
 Muhammad with a walking stick seemingly on a desert trek, with the sun on the left, low on the horizon. He has a concerned expression on his face.  He leads by rope a donkey or mule that carries a burden.
 A nervous caricaturist at work, sweating profusely, looks over his shoulder and partially hides what he's doing with his left arm as he shakily draws the portrait of a bearded keffiyeh-wearing man, labelled "MOHAMMED". There is but one light on in the room he is in and it only shines from directly above his head covering only the drawing he works on.
 A scene in an oriental palace, with two angry bearded men charging forward: one holding a scimitar, the other holding a bomb and seemingly carrying another weapon (possibly a rifle) on his back; while their leader (presumably Muhammad) addresses them: "Rolig, venner, når alt kommer til alt er det jo bare en tegning lavet af en vantro sønderjyde", referring to a drawing in his hand. In English, his words are: "Relax, friends, at the end of the day, it's just a drawing by a 'South Jutlander' infidel".
 A 7th grade Middle-Eastern looking boy in front of a blackboard. Sticking out his tongue, he points to a Persian passage written on the board with chalk, which translates into "The editorial team of Jyllands-Posten is a bunch of reactionary provocateurs". The boy is labelled "Mohammed, Valby school, 7.A", implying that he is a second-generation child of immigrants to Denmark rather than the Islamic prophet. On his shirt is written "FREM" and then in a new line "-TIDEN". Fremtiden means "the future", but Frem (forward) is also the name of a Valby football team whose uniforms resemble the boy's shirt. The cartoonist who drew this particular cartoon was the first to receive death threats and left his home in Valby.
 Muhammad wearing an imamah (turban) and prepared for battle, with a kilij in his hand and likely a scimitar tucked in a shoulder strap scabbard behind him. He is flanked by two women in niqabs, having only their wide open eyes visible through band-shaped eye openings while an equivalently sized band-shaped black bar censors his eyes as though it was cut from one of the niqabs. His face is quite obscured by a thick grey beard and bushy eyebrows.
 Muhammad, dressed like a mullah, stands on a cloud as if in Heaven, greeting freshly arrived dead suicide bombers with "Stop Stop vi er løbet tør for Jomfruer!" (English: "Stop, stop, we have run out of virgins!"), an allusion to the reward of seventy-two virgins promised to Islamic martyrs (known as Shahid).

And in the centre:
 A police line-up of seven people wearing turbans, with the witness saying: "Hm... jeg kan ikke lige genkende ham" ("Hm... I can't really recognise him"). Not all people in the line-up are immediately identifiable. They are: (1) A generic hippie, (2) right-wing politician Pia Kjærsgaard, (3) possibly Jesus, (4) possibly Buddha, (5) possibly Muhammad, (6) generic Indian Sikh or possibly Danish stand-up comedian Omar Marzouk, and (7) journalist and writer Kåre Bluitgen, carrying a sign saying: "Kåres PR, ring og få et tilbud" ("Kåre's public relations, call and get an offer").

References 

D
Editorial cartoons